The Polish law or legal system in Poland has been developing since the first centuries of Polish history, over 1,000 years ago. The public and private laws of Poland are codified.

The supreme law in Poland is the Constitution of Poland. Poland is a civil law legal jurisdiction and has a civil code, the Civil Code of Poland. The Polish parliament creates legislation (law) and is made up of the 'Senate' (upper house) and the Sejm (lower house).

Legal areas 
Polish public and private laws are divided into various areas, including, for example:
civil law (prawo cywilne), much of which is contained in the Polish Civil Code
commercial law (prawo handlowe) notably the Polish Code of Commercial Partnerships and Companies
copyright law (prawo autorskie), see copyright law in Poland for details
administrative law (prawo administracyjne)
constitutional law (prawo konstytucyjne)
private international law (prawo prywatne międzynarodowe)
tax laws (prawo podatkowe)
criminal law (prawo karne)
family law (prawo rodzinne)
labour law (prawo pracy)
water law (prawo wodne)
media law (prawo prasowe).

New Polish law is published in Dziennik Ustaw and Monitor Polski (see promulgation).

Law in Poland is administered by the judiciary of Poland and enforced by the law enforcement in Poland.

See also
Lawyers in Poland
Legal systems of the world
List of law faculties in Poland

External links
- Principles of Polish company law
- Principles of Polish contract law
- Principles of Polish insurance law
- Principles of Polish public procurement law
- Corporate law in Poland